Mink Creek may refer to:

Rivers in New York State
 Mink Creek (Canadarago Lake tributary), a creek in Otsego County
 Mink Creek (Fish Creek), a creek in Lewis County
 Mink Creek (Lake Ontario), a creek in Wayne County

Places
 Mink Creek, Idaho, an unincorporated community in Franklin County, Idaho